Åkra is a former municipality in the traditional district of Haugaland in Rogaland county, Norway.  The  municipality existed from 1892 until 1965 and it encompassed the central part of the western coast of the island of Karmøy. The administrative centre was the village of Åkrehamn.

History
The municipality of Aakra was established on 1 January 1892 when it was split off from the municipality of Skudenes. Initially, the new municipality had a population of 1,962.  On 1 January 1965, the municipality of Åkra was dissolved due to recommendations by the Schei Committee.  Åkra was merged with the neighboring municipalities of Avaldsnes, Skudenes, Stangaland, and Torvastad and with the towns of Kopervik and Skudeneshavn to form the new, larger  municipality of Karmøy.  Before the merger Åkra had a population of 6,008.

Attractions
The Old Åkra Church dates back to 1821. It was built of wood and has 320 seats. The church was restored in 1852 and 1899. Rogaland Fishery Museum is situated on the harbor in Åkrahamn. It contains a restored herring works with a collection of artifacts and equipment associated with the local fishing and shipping industries.

Government
All municipalities in Norway, including Åkra, are responsible for primary education (through 10th grade), outpatient health services, senior citizen services, unemployment and other social services, zoning, economic development, and municipal roads.  The municipality is governed by a municipal council of elected representatives, which in turn elects a mayor.

Municipal council
The municipal council  of Åkra was made up of representatives that were elected to four year terms.  The party breakdown of the final municipal council was as follows:

See also
List of former municipalities of Norway

References

External links
 Åkrehamn Veksts website

Karmøy
Former municipalities of Norway
1892 establishments in Norway
1964 disestablishments in Norway
Populated places established in 1892